Santa Ana, officially the Municipality of Santa Ana, is a 2nd class municipality in the province of Cagayan, Philippines. According to the 2020 census, it has a population of 35,688 people.

The municipality is on the north-easternmost point of Luzon and includes Palaui Island as well. It is the home of the Cagayan Special Economic Zone and the Naval Base Camilo Osias (Naval Operating Base San Vicente) in Barangay San Vicente.

Etymology
The town got its name after the acronym of the surnames of three provincial officials: Arranz, Navarro and Avena.

History
Some fishermen from Minanga (a barrio of Gonzaga) came and settled in Palawig. The purpose of the organization was to acquire and occupy lands around the place. That same year, Briccio Campañano of Lapog, Ilocos Sur together with some others from Ilocos came to Palawig to apply for homesteads in the sitio of Marede. These settlers organized another  called Dagupan.

In 1900, the woodcutters from Aparri led by Don Julian Astigarraga arrived by the first boat. Thus, began the clearing of settlements.

From 1919 to 1935 several groups of settlers from the Ilocos Region came to claim lands aboard  (light seagoing boats). The once-forested areas were accessible only via rivers and the sea. Before reaching the settlements in the northern and eastern portions, they had to navigate through the Palawig River.

The name Palawig was coined from the local term , meaning mouth of the river.

In 1935, the  Inanama and Dagupan fused into one called Da Inanama. Headed by Navarro, they began to work for the separation of Palawig as a municipality independent from Gonzaga. Their application was held in abeyance because their population did not meet the needed number required by law. The move was suspended in 1941 and when World War II broke out the move was not carried out.

Barrio Palawig and its neighboring barrios were separated from Gonzaga and the town was created by President Elpidio Quirino via Executive Order No. 289 (21 October 1949). Contrary to the usual assumption, it is not named for Saint Anne but is an acronym of the surnames of the then-three provincial officials: Governor Nicasio Arranz; and Provincial Board members Federico Navarro; and Roberto Avena. The association to the saint was a back-formation in keeping with traditional Hispanicised toponyms.

Geography

Barangays
Santa Ana is politically subdivided into barangays. These barangays are headed by elected officials: Barangay Captain, Barangay Council, whose members are called Barangay Councilors. All are elected every three years.

Climate

Demographics

Economy

Santa Ana is a mix of agricultural and commercial economy. Most of the commercial and industrial activities are at Port Irene as the Cagayan Special Economic Zone in Barangay Casambalangan.

Some of its agricultural and aquatic products are rice, corn, peanut, fish, lumber, shells, etc. Among its natural resources are limestone deposits at Bawac Mountain, coal at Carbon Mountain, Santa Clara and guano deposit at Kapannikian Cave.

Tourism

Aside from the Cagayan Special Economic Zone which host casinos and other gaming facilities, scenic spots and historical landmarks are present in this town. These include:
Cape Engaño Lighthouse/Cove (USA Survivor 27 and 28 filming area)
Siwangag Cove (USA Survivor 27 and 28 filming area)
White beaches like Anguib Beach, Mapurao Beach, Nangaramoan Beach, and Puzo Robo Beach
Gotan mangrove forest and waterfalls
Suncity Casino in Barangay Tangatan
Buwacag Falls at Santa Clara (Open for public), Padlas Falls at Casambalangan, Lamesa Falls at Casagan (not yet ready for public)
Sinago Cove (Close for Public)
Magawigaw Beach (Close for Public)
Dumasag River at Rapuli
Pananacpan white Beach (soon to open) by PETA -Pananacpan Eco-Tourism Association
Riding Takuli (a traditional kayak) and firefly watching at Barangay Casagan
Tangatan Little Baguio (soon to Open)
Belt Fishing Activity at Diora-Zinungan

Santa Ana is the game fishing hub of the Philippines. It has hosted international decathlons, where athletes run through the rugged terrain of Punta Verde to Cape Engaño, then dipped in the crystal clear water of the Philippine Sea.

Government
Santa Ana, belonging to the first legislative district of the province of Cagayan, is governed by a mayor designated as its local chief executive and by a municipal council as its legislative body in accordance with the Local Government Code. The mayor, vice mayor, and the councilors are elected directly by the people through an election which is being held every three years.

Elected officials

Education
The Schools Division of Cagayan governs the town's public education system. The division office is a field office of the DepEd in Cagayan Valley region. The office governs the public and private elementary and public and private high schools throughout the municipality.

Culture
Every May 26 to May 30 of the year, the town plays host to the Viray Festival, organized by the local government with the support of the regional tourism office and the private sector.

A  is a large wooden flat boat which, before the use of gasoline-fed engines in the early 1950s, was propelled by sails. Equipped with oars to reach nearby fishing grounds, these types sailed for longer distances.

Leaders and well-off families derived income from the services of the viray ranging from fishing operation, commerce and trade to means of transport during the years when Santa Ana was at its prime. It is assisted by small  during the fishing operation.

An annual fluvial parade of colorful boats is held during the first day.

The second day of the festival features a grand carabao parade where each of the 16  composing the municipality has their turn to show off their artistic talents.

On the third day, local folks and visitors alike line up along the main street to watch colorful bodies participating in the street dancing competition.

Sports
Santa Ana is also known as one of the sites for Kiteboarding and Windsurfing. In 2015, the Philippine Windsurfing Association and the Philippine Kiteboarding Association organized a Kiteboarding and Windsurfing competition in Anguib Beach, known as the paradise for kiteboarders and windsurfers.

In 2016, Beach Volleyball Republic hosts the third leg of the Nationwide On Tour, also in Anguib Beach. Beach volleybelles Charo Soriano, who is a native from Tuguegarao, and Filipino-American Alexa Micek won the third leg of the BVR On Tour.

References

External links

[ Philippine Standard Geographic Code]
Philippine Census Information
Manidad Island in Santa Ana Cagayan Valley

Municipalities of Cagayan
Port cities and towns in the Philippines
Beaches of the Philippines
Establishments by Philippine executive order